Kenkō is a crater on Mercury. It has a diameter of 99 kilometers. Its name was adopted by the International Astronomical Union (IAU) in 1976. Kenko is named for the Japanese author Yoshida Kenkō, who lived from 1283 to 1352.

Balagtas crater is to the east of Kenkō, Mahler is to the west, and Hitomaro is to the north.

References

Impact craters on Mercury